Vincent Dutrait (born 1976) is a French illustrator. He studied at the École Émile Cohl from 1994 to 1997, where he later taught between 1999 and 2003. Born in 1976 in Provence, he now lives with his wife in the north of Seoul, South Korea.

Best known for his prolific work in the role playing game and board game industries, he has also produced a large number of illustrations, artbooks and comics for both European and Asian clients.

External links 
 List of board games with artwork by Dutrait

1976 births
Fantasy artists
French illustrators
French speculative fiction artists
Living people
Role-playing game artists